Bagarius bagarius, also known as the devil catfish, dwarf goonch or goonch, is a species of catfish in the genus Bagarius. It is generally reported as being found in large and medium rivers in South Asia, and is likely synonymous with B. yarrelli.

Taxonomy
Prior to 2021, the standard was to recognize two species of Bagarius from the Indian Subcontinent: First B. bagarius, supposedly a small species (up to ) first described in 1822 by Francis Buchanan-Hamilton based on a specimen from the Ganges River. The second is B. yarrelli, supposedly a very large species (up to ) first described in 1839 by William Henry Sykes based on a specimen from the Mula-Mutha River. Recent studies have not been able to document that more than one species exists in the Indian subcontinent, which, if confirmed, would mean that the name B. bagarius is a senior synonym of B. yarrelli, which was confirmed by a 2021 study. In contrast, Southeast Asian populations from the Mekong and Chao Phraya basins typically included in B. bagarius likely represent a separate species, which a 2021 study found to be the new species B. vegrandis.

The larger type has been accused of several fatal attacks on humans in the Mahakali River that is Nepal's western border with India.

Aquarium
B. vegrandis is the only member of the genus even marginally suitable for home aquaria. It requires cool, fast-flowing water, and eats bloodworms, shrimp and live or dead fish. Reports exist of very anti-social behaviour by these fish in captivity.

References 

5. 'Giant Baghair caught in Jamuna' in The Daily Star (Bangladesh), May 12, 2009]

Sisoridae
Fish described in 1822
Fish of Bangladesh
Fish of Bhutan
Fish of India
Fish of Nepal